Lucy Safo is a Ghanaian writer. 

Safo's first novel, Cry a Whisper, won the Commonwealth Writers' Prize 'Best First Book' for the Africa region in 1994. Cry a Whisper (1993)  was a historical novel set around the triangular slave trade between Liverpool, West Africa and the Caribbean.

Works
 Cry a Whisper. London: Bogle-L'Ouverture Press, 1993.

References

Ghanaian novelists
Year of birth missing (living people)
Living people
Place of birth missing (living people)
20th-century Ghanaian women writers